The N.300 Naviplane was a French 30-ton multipurpose Air-cushion vehicle built by SEDAM (Société d'Etude et de Développement des Aéroglisseurs Marins) for the Naviplane series of Aéroglisseur (Hovercraft).

This was a series of multi-skirt hovercraft built by SEDAM using and developing the skirt designs by French engineer Jean Bertin. The series included the Naviplane N102, the Naviplane N300 and the N500 Naviplane, the N300 Naviplane was the first full-scale Naviplane designed for commercial use.

Production

Two N.300 were built by SEDAM:

 Baie des Anges
 La Croisette

Operators

 Société Naviplane (1969): both N300 used from Nice Airport with connections to Cannes, Saint-Tropez, Monaco and San-Remo.
 Gironde local government (1972): Baie des Anges used for ferry service between the Pauillac, Blaye and Lamarque with modifications to carry 38 passengers and 4 cars
 French Navy (1972): La Croisette was loaned to the Navy for evaluation in Toulon

Fate

After 1973 both craft were stored by SEDAM in Pauillac until the firm ceased operations. Baie des Anges was sold to restaurateur in Maubuisson as floating restaurant, but plan never materialized. Returned to SEDAM, Baie des Anges and La Croisette were scrapped after 1983.

Specifications (N.300)
Overall length: 
Overall Beam: 
Overall Height: 
Skirt height: 
Cushion area: 
Deck area: 
Gross weight: 30 metric tonnes
Payload: 11.5 metric tonnes
Seating capacity: up to 110
Fuel capacity: 2 tons
Maximum speed (calm water): 65 knots (120 km/h)
Cruising speed (calm water): 50 knots (92 km/h)

Multi-skirt (Jean Bertin)

Naviplane N300 MKII
The Naviplane N300 MKII was a proposed improved model of the N300. It was intended as a 120-seat, high-speed amphibious hoverferry for commercial use and a wide range of military roles.

References

Hovercraft